Rodulfo is both a given name and a surname. Notable people with the name include:

Rodulfo Brito Foucher (1899–1970), Mexican lawyer and academic
Rodulfo del Valle (1871–1948), Puerto Rican politician
Néstor Rodulfo (born 1972), Puerto Rican actor
Peter Rodulfo (born 1958), British artist and sculptor